Brachysomida californica is a species of long-horned beetle in the subfamily Lepturinae from western North America. It was described by John Lawrence LeConte in 1851 from the Santa Cruz Mountains in California.

Subtaxons
There are five varietets in species:
Brachysomida californica var. fusca (LeConte, 1857)
Brachysomida californica var. mollipilosa (LeConte, 1860)
Brachysomida californica var. subcyanea (LeConte, 1857)
Brachysomida californica var. tumida (LeConte, 1857)
Brachysomida californica var. viola (LeConte, 1860)

References

Lepturinae
Beetles described in 1851
Endemic fauna of California
Fauna without expected TNC conservation status